is a railway station in the city of  Namerikawa, Toyama, Japan, operated by the private railway operator Toyama Chihō Railway.

Lines

Station layout 
The station has two opposed ground-level side platforms  connected to the wooden station building by a level crossing. The station is unattended.

History
Hayatsukikazumi Station was opened on 23 March 1950.

Adjacent stations

Surrounding area 
The station is located in a residential area.

See also
 List of railway stations in Japan

External links

 

Railway stations in Toyama Prefecture
Railway stations in Japan opened in 1950
Stations of Toyama Chihō Railway
Namerikawa, Toyama